Alhaji Muhammadu Dikko Yusufu also known as MD Yusufu or MD Yusuf (November 10, 1931 – April 1, 2015) was a Nigerian policeman, Inspector General of the Nigerian Police Force, public servant and politician. Yusufu attended Higher Education at the Institute of Administration, Zaria in 1954 and University of Oxford where he was trained as administrative officer.

Yusufu started work at the Katsina Native Authority serving as Assistant District Officer in Ilorin Province from 1949 to 1954. Yusufu rose to the position of Inspector General of the Nigerian Police, a post he held from 1975 to 1979 during the military rule of Generals Murtala Mohammed and Olusegun Obasanjo. He was appointed chairman of Nigeria Liquefied Natural Gas (NLNG) in 1994.
In 1998, he registered Movement for Democracy and Justice as a political party and in 1999 and 2003, he ran as a presidential candidate on its platform. In the December 1998 local government elections, the party came 4th and won 83 councilor seats in 21 States of the Federation and Chairmanship of Warri in Delta State, Hadejia in Jigawa State and Bama in Borno.

Yusufu was chairman of Nigeria LNG in 1994, when a consortium led by Halliburton's KBR subsidiary was bidding for a contract to construct a LNG export facility in competition with the US corporation Bechtel. In a letter to Yusufu in September 1994, the oil minister Don Etiebet said that the NLNG board had "seriously tinkered with the integrity of the pending contract award". He considered that there had been breaches of commercial confidentiality, that may have benefited the consortium led by KBR.

During a probe into alleged bribes by KBR, a London-based consultant, Mr Jeffrey Tesler said he had advanced money to Muhammadu Dikko Yusufu in the form of a repayable loan.
The $70,000 loan was made during a visit by Yusufu to London in 1998 or 1999.
Attempts were made to implicate US Vice-President Dick Cheney in the corruption scandal, which involved over $180m of bribes on behalf of a consortium led by Halliburton.

He joined National Council of Nigeria and the Cameroons (NCNC) in 1950, and Northern Elements Progressive Union (NEPU) in 1951, but gave up politics when he joined the Northern Regional Service. In the second republic after retirement from police he became a member of the People's Redemption Party. Yusufu indicated interest to contest the Presidential elections under the Grassroots Democratic Movement in Nigeria during the period of transition to democracy launched by General Sani Abacha in 1997–1998. The Party had a left wing orientation.
In 2000, he became chairman of the Arewa Consultative Forum, a Northern cultural and political association.

After the April 2003 elections, both Muhammadu Buhari of the ANPP and Yusufu, who had run as presidential candidate of the Movement for Democracy and Justice (MDJ), 
challenged the election victory of President Obasanjo.
However, in June 2003, Yusufu, said that defeated contestants who were not ready to go to court should accept their defeat in good faith.

In November 2003, Yusufu said the grant of asylum by President Olusegun Obasanjo to the deposed Liberian president, Charles Taylor could not be defended on the grounds of either justice or commonsense, and was therefore impeachable.

MD Yusufu died on April 1, 2015 in Abuja.

References

2015 deaths
Candidates for President of Nigeria
Grassroots Democratic Movement politicians
Inspectors general
1931 births
Candidates in the Nigerian general election, 2003